Adongo is both a surname and a given name. Notable people with the name include:

Ambrose Adeya Adongo (1947–2001), Kenyan trade unionist
Daniel Adongo (born 1989), Kenyan rugby union player
Adongo Agada Cham (1959–2011), Sudanese King

Masculine given names